Trudy McIntosh (born 30 July 1984) is an Australian artistic gymnast.

McIntosh competed at the 2000 Summer Olympics in Sydney. She also competed at the 1998 Commonwealth Games winning gold medals in the team and beam events, a silver medal in the vault event and a bronze medal in the individual all-around event.

References

1984 births
Living people
Sportspeople from Geelong
Olympic gymnasts of Australia
Gymnasts at the 2000 Summer Olympics
Gymnasts at the 1998 Commonwealth Games
Australian female artistic gymnasts
Commonwealth Games gold medallists for Australia
Commonwealth Games silver medallists for Australia
Commonwealth Games bronze medallists for Australia
Commonwealth Games medallists in gymnastics
21st-century Australian women
Medallists at the 1998 Commonwealth Games